McDonald Creek is a creek in Walker County, Texas, United States.

McDonald Creek has the name of William McDonald, a pioneer who settled there.

See also
List of rivers of Texas

References

Rivers of Walker County, Texas
Rivers of Texas